Sunrisers Hyderabad (SRH) are a franchise cricket team based in Hyderabad, India, which plays in the Indian Premier League (IPL). They were one of the eight teams competing in the 2014 Indian Premier League. This was their second outing in IPL. The team was being captained by Shikhar Dhawan but later replaced by Darren Sammy. The team was coached by Tom Moody with Waqar Younis as their bowling coach, VVS Laxman and Kris Srikkanth as the mentors for this team.

The Sunrisers started their campaign against Rajasthan Royals on 18 April 2014 at Abu Dhabi on a losing note and failed to qualify for Play-Offs finishing 6th at the end of the tournament.

Background
Due to the 2014 Lok Sabha Elections the season was partially held outside India with the opening 20 IPL matches which includes 5 SRH matches in the UAE with the remaining matches played in India from May 2 onwards.

Administration and support staff

 Owner – Kalanithi Maran (Sun Network)
 Head coach – Tom Moody
 Assistant coach – Simon Helmot
 Bowling coach – Waqar Younis
 Mentor – VVS Laxman & Kris Srikkanth
 Source :

Kit Manufacturers and Sponsors

 Source :

Players Auction 

The players auction for the 2014 Indian Premier League held on 12 and 13 February 2014. All eight franchises had participated in the auction. SRH has retained 2 players and released 11 players from the previous season. As a result of this retention the team had an auction purse of Rs 380 million and 2 Right To Match(RTM) cards. Added 22 players to the team. They used two RTM card to bring Amit Mishra
and Darren Sammy back into the team.

Retained Players: Shikhar Dhawan, Dale Steyn

Released Players: Kumar Sangakkara, Anand Rajan, Ankit Sharma, Ashish Reddy, Quinton de Kock, Jean-Paul Duminy, Chris Lynn, Nathan McCullum, Clint McKay, Amit Mishra, Parthiv Patel, Thisara Perera, Padmanabhan Prasanth, Veer Pratap Singh, Sachin Rana, Dwaraka Ravi Teja, Akshath Reddy, Biplab Samantray, Darren Sammy, Ishant Sharma, Karn Sharma, Thalaivan Sargunam, Sudeep Tyagi, Hanuma Vihari, Cameron White

Added Players: David Warner, Darren Sammy, Amit Mishra, Irfan Pathan, Ishant Sharma, Bhuvneshwar Kumar, Brendan Taylor, Moisés Henriques, Venugopal Rao, Jason Holder, Aaron Finch, Srikkanth Anirudha, Manpreet Juneja, K. L. Rahul, Parvez Rasool, Prasanth Parameswaran, Karn Sharma, Amit Paunikar, Naman Ojha, Ricky Bhui, Ashish Reddy, Chama Milind

Squad 
 Players with international caps are listed in bold.
 Signed Year denotes year from which player is associated with Sunrisers Hyderabad

Season Overview

Standings

Results by match

Fixtures

League stage

Statistics 

Full Table on Cricinfo
 Last updated: 26 Oct 2017

Awards and Achievements

Player of the match awards

Achievements
Best Catches of the season : Dale Steyn

Reaction
The IPL saw increase in its brand value in 2014 to 3.2 billion while the Sunrisers' brand value was increased by 57% to 25 million from its purchase value of 15.9 million in 2013, according to American Appraisal.

See also
List of Sunrisers Hyderabad records

References

External links
Sunrisers Hyderabad official website

2014 Indian Premier League
Sunrisers Hyderabad seasons
Cricket in Hyderabad, India